John Joseph Perry Gorsica, born Gorczyca (March 29, 1915 – December 16, 1998), was an American professional baseball player, a right-handed pitcher who worked in 204 Major League games over seven seasons (1940–1944; 1946–1947) for the Detroit Tigers.

Born in Bayonne, New Jersey, Gorsica went to West Virginia University before signing his first professional contract and making his debut as a first baseman with a West Virginia-based minor league team, the Class D Beckley Bengals, in 1937. He converted to pitcher the following year and broke into the Major Leagues with the  Tigers on April 22 at age 25.  The 1940 Tigers won the American League pennant, finishing ahead of the Cleveland Indians in a race that went to the season's last game. As a rookie, Gorsica split 14 decisions. He appeared in 29 games pitched, 20 as a starter, and threw five complete games with two shutouts. He excelled in the 1940 World Series against the Cincinnati Reds, allowing only one run for a 0.79 earned run average in  innings pitched, and striking out four.  He pitched  innings in Game 2 and  innings in Game 6, both times coming in to relieve starter Schoolboy Rowe.  Cincinnati won the Series, however, in seven games.

Relying on an overhand sinkerball, Gorscia both started and relieved during his Major League career, making 64 career starts.  He was among the league leaders in saves (as yet an unofficial statistic) three straight years from 1942 to 1944, and collected 17 saves during his MLB tenure. Gorsica served in the United States Navy during World War II and missed the  baseball season, when the Tigers won the world championship.

All told, he allowed 778 hits and 247 bases on balls in  MLB innings pitched, with 272 strikeouts.

He died in 1998 in a hospital in Charlottesville, Virginia.

References

External links
 Baseball-Reference.com
 Baseball Almanac
 Baseball Library
 
 Baseball in Wartime biography

1915 births
1998 deaths
Baseball players from New Jersey
Beaumont Exporters players
Beckley Bengals players
Detroit Tigers players
Hollywood Stars players
Major League Baseball pitchers
Sportspeople from Bayonne, New Jersey
San Diego Padres (minor league) players
Seattle Rainiers players
West Virginia Mountaineers baseball players
United States Navy personnel of World War II